Yu Shuran, also known as Jessica Shuran Yu, (于书然, born August 4, 2000) is a Chinese-born former competitive figure skater who represented Singapore internationally. Competing in ladies' singles, she became the 2017 Southeast Asian Games champion and a two-time national champion. She skated in the final segment at two ISU Championships.

Personal life
Yu was born on August 4, 2000, in Beijing, China. Her mother and father were born in China, with her father obtaining Singaporean citizenship subsequently. As of 2020, Yu is enrolled at Fordham University in New York City.

Skating career

2014–2015 season
Gao Song coached Yu in Beijing, China, since at least the 2014–2015 season. Making her junior international debut, Yu placed 8th at the Asian Open Trophy in August 2014. In October of the same year, she appeared at her first ISU Junior Grand Prix (JGP) event, placing 9th in Zagreb, Croatia. In March 2015, she qualified for the free skate at her first ISU Championship – the 2015 World Junior Championships in Tallinn, Estonia and finished 24th overall.

2015–2016 season
Yu remained on the junior level during the 2015–2016 season. She placed 28th and was eliminated after the short program at the 2016 World Junior Championships, held in March in Debrecen, Hungary.

2016–2017 season
Yu's senior international debut came in August 2016 at the Asian Open Trophy in Manila, Philippines. After placing 5th at the event, Yu competed at a JGP event in Germany and then returned to the senior level. In February 2017, she placed 21st at the Four Continents Championships in Gangneung, South Korea, and 6th at the Asian Winter Games in Sapporo, Japan. In Japan, she obtained the minimum technical scores to compete at the 2017 World Championships in Helsinki, Finland, making her the first figure skater to represent Singapore at the World Championships.

2017–2018 season
Yu began her season by becoming the first female figure skater to win a gold medal at the Southeast Asian Games. She placed first in the short program and second in the free skate.

In September 2017, Yu competed in Oberstdorf, Germany, at the 2017 CS Nebelhorn Trophy, the final qualifying opportunity for the 2018 Winter Olympics. Her placement, 9th out of 35 skaters, was not high enough to qualify but Singapore became the second alternate for an Olympic spot.

Around January 2018, Yu was hospitalized and diagnosed with a neurological disorder. As a result, she missed the rest of the season, including the 2018 Singapore National Championships and the 2018 Four Continents Championships. Although her health improved with treatment, she learned that she would not be able to return to competition. In June 2018, she officially announced her retirement from competitive skating.

Training abuse in China
In July 2020, Yu stated that she was abused from the age of 11 while training in China. She said that her coach would often hit her with a plastic skate guard, sometimes more than ten times in a row, and when she was 14, he kicked her in the shin with a toe pick (jagged teeth on the front of a skate blade). She also described what she witnessed while working as a coach in Beijing: "I saw one junior skater get hit and dragged off the ice, while another was pressured into competing on two torn ligaments, which left them needing surgery afterwards."

Programs

Competitive highlights 
GP: Grand Prix; CS: Challenger Series; JGP: Junior Grand Prix

References

External links 
 

2000 births
Singaporean female single skaters
Figure skaters at the 2017 Asian Winter Games
Asian Games competitors for Singapore
Sportspeople from Beijing
Chinese emigrants to Singapore
Singaporean sportspeople of Chinese descent
Living people
Southeast Asian Games gold medalists for Singapore
Southeast Asian Games medalists in figure skating
Competitors at the 2017 Southeast Asian Games